Ingrid Caven is a 2000 novel by the French writer Jean-Jacques Schuhl. It received the Prix Goncourt.

See also
 2000 in literature
 Contemporary French literature
 Ingrid Caven

References

2000 French novels
French-language novels
Prix Goncourt winning works
Éditions Gallimard books